David Nachman Lourea (August 26, 1945–November 10, 1992) was an American writer, AIDS activist, and bisexual rights activist.

He was raised as Orthodox Jewish, and was openly bisexual.

In 1967 he earned a B.F.A. from Temple University; he later earned a Ph.D. from the Institute for Advanced Study of Human Sexuality. He was involved with San Francisco Sex Information after moving to that city in 1973, and was one of the early members of the San Francisco Bisexual Center (which was active from 1976 to 1985). In 1981 he and Cynthia Slater "presented safer-sex education workshops in bathhouses and BDSM clubs in San Francisco." In 1984 he finally persuaded the San Francisco Department of Public Health to recognize bisexual men in their official AIDS statistics (the weekly "New AIDS cases and mortality statistics" report), after two years of campaigning. Health departments throughout the United States began to recognize bisexual men because of this, whereas before they had mostly only recognized gay men. He was also one of the founders of Bisexual Counseling Services.

He died in 1992 from kidney failure associated with AIDS.

The David Lourea Papers, 1940–1992, are held at the James C. Hormel LGBTQIA Center in the San Francisco Public Library.

Publications of David Lourea 
 '"Beyond Bisexual," in Bi Any Other Name: Bisexual People Speak Out, ed. Loraine Hutchins and Lani Kaʻahumanu, Boston: Alyson Pub., 1991, .
 "Psychological aspects of bisexuality. Psycho-social issues related to counseling bisexuals", in Bisexualities : theory and research, ed. Dr. Fritz Klein and Timothy J. Wolf, New York: Haworth Press, 1985, ; also published as Journal of Homosexuality, volume 11, numbers 1/2, spring 1985.
 "HIV Prevention: A Dramaturgical Analysis and Practical Guide to Creating Safer Sex Interventions" (with Clark L. Taylor), in Rethinking AIDS prevention : cultural approaches, ed. Ralph Bolton and Merrill Singer, Philadelphia : Gordon and Breach Science Publishers, 1992, originally published in volume 14, numbers 2-4 of the journal Medical Anthropology.

Further reading 
 Naomi Tucker, "Bay Area Bisexual History: An Interview with David Lourea," in Bisexual Politics: Theories, Queries, and Visions, Harrington Park Press/Haworth Press 1995, pp. 47–61.
 Andrea Sharon Dworkin, "Bisexual Histories in San Francisco in the 1970s and Early 1980s", Journal of Bisexuality, Volume 1, Issue 1, 2000, pages 87– 119.

References

1945 births
Activists from Philadelphia
Temple University alumni
Institute for Advanced Study of Human Sexuality alumni
Sexuality in San Francisco
Sex educators
HIV/AIDS activists
American health activists
20th-century American Jews
LGBT Jews
American LGBT rights activists
Bisexual men
Bisexual rights activists
AIDS-related deaths in California
1992 deaths
Activists from the San Francisco Bay Area
20th-century American LGBT people
American bisexual writers